Caffe (Convolutional Architecture for Fast Feature Embedding) is a deep learning framework, originally developed at University of California, Berkeley. It is open source, under a BSD license. It is written in C++, with a Python interface.

History 
Yangqing Jia created the Caffe project during his PhD at UC Berkeley. It is currently hosted on GitHub.

Features 
Caffe supports many different types of deep learning architectures geared towards image classification and image segmentation. It supports CNN, RCNN, LSTM and fully-connected neural network designs. Caffe supports GPU- and CPU-based acceleration computational kernel libraries such as Nvidia cuDNN and Intel MKL.

Applications 
Caffe is being used in academic research projects, startup prototypes, and even large-scale industrial applications in vision, speech, and multimedia. Yahoo! has also integrated Caffe with Apache Spark to create CaffeOnSpark, a distributed deep learning framework.

Caffe2 
In April 2017, Facebook announced Caffe2, which included new features such as recurrent neural network (RNN).
At the end of March 2018, Caffe2 was merged into PyTorch.

See also
 Comparison of deep learning software

References

External links
 

Deep learning software
Free science software
Free statistical software
Image processing
Information technology companies of the United States
Software using the BSD license